Martin Anthony Gavin Rush (born 25 December 1964) is a male British racewalker.

Athletics career
Rush competed in the men's 20 kilometres walk at the 1992 Summer Olympics. He represented England in the 30km walk event, at the 1986 Commonwealth Games in Edinburgh, Scotland.

References

External links
 

1964 births
Living people
Athletes (track and field) at the 1992 Summer Olympics
British male racewalkers
Olympic athletes of Great Britain
Athletes (track and field) at the 1986 Commonwealth Games
Commonwealth Games competitors for England